Luen group is one of several organized crime groups of Hong Kong, known as triads. The membership of the group exceeds 8,000 and is made up of several subgroups. These include Luen Lok Tong, Luen Tei Ying, Luen To Ying, Luen Ying She, and Luen Kung Lok.

The Luen Kung Lok reportedly run illegal gambling clubs, extortion, protection rackets and other crimes as well as legal entertainment business in Hong Kong. The triad has a strong presence in Toronto and has associates in the U.S.

See also 
 List of Chinese criminal organizations

External links
 Chinese Organized Crime and Illegal Alien Trafficking: Humans as a Commodity

References

Gangs in Toronto
Organised crime groups in Hong Kong
Triad groups